The Saint Helena Medal was the first French campaign medal.  It was established in 1857 by a decree of emperor Napoleon III to recognise participation in the campaigns led by emperor Napoleon I.

Emperor Napoléon I, creator of the Order of the Legion of Honour and various other orders, never instituted commemorative campaign medals for his soldiers. In time, many veterans of these campaigns, sometimes called the "débris de la Grande Armée", began meeting within various new veterans' associations. Keeping alive their war memories and the myth of Napoléon in popular culture, they issued many unofficial commemorative and associative medals.

It would be forty two years after the last battles and exile of the emperor to the island of Saint Helena before the need to adequately and officially recognise the service of these combat veterans was eventually recognised officially by an imperial decree of Emperor Napoléon III creating, on 12 August 1857, the Saint Helena Medal.According to Fondation Napoléon 450,000 old soldiers were recorded as being alive, in the 1850s.

Award statute
The Saint Helena Medal was awarded to all French and foreign soldiers, from the land armies or naval fleets, who served the Republic or the Empire between the years 1792 and 1815 inclusive.

The medal was awarded with no condition of minimum time of service or participation in a particular military campaign; it was, however, necessary to prove one's right to the medal with a record of service or leave record.

A later decree of 16 April 1864 added the Saint Helena Medal to the list of awards that could be revoked following a condemnation to a fixed prison term of one year or more for a crime committed by the recipient.

The Saint Helena Medal was accompanied by an award certificate from the Grand Chancery of the Legion of Honour and came in a white cardboard box with intricate ornamentation on the lid in the form of an embossed imperial eagle over the inscription on seven lines "AUX  COMPAGNONS  DE  GLOIRE  DE  NAPOLÉON I  DÉCRET  IMPÉRIAL  DU  12  AOÛT  1857".

Award description
The Saint Helena Medal is of irregular shape and struck from bronze.  It is a 2 cm in diameter circular medallion surrounded by a 50mm wide laurel wreath tied with a bow at the bottom.  Atop the medal, a 2 cm wide Imperial Crown.  The obverse of the medallion bears the relief image of the right profile of Emperor Napoleon I surrounded by the relief inscription "NAPOLÉON I EMPEREUR".  A ring or small orbs separates the central medallion from the wreath.  Just below the image of the emperor, a small anchor, the privy mark of the award's designer, Désiré-Albert Barre.

The reverse is identical except for the medallion which bears the relief circular inscription within a narrow 20mm band  "CAMPAGNES DE 1792 A 1815". In the centre, the relief inscription on nine lines "A" "SES" "COMPAGNONS" "DE GLOIRE" "SA DERNIÈRE" "PENSÉE" "STE HÉLÈNE" "5 MAI" "1821".

The medal should hang from a 38mm wide green silk moiré ribbon bearing five 1,8mm wide red vertical stripes spaced 4,5mm apart and 1mm red edge stripes.  The ribbon passes through a suspension ring, itself passing through a lateral hole in the imperial crown's orb atop the medal.

Notable recipients (partial list)

Military
Marshal of France Jean-Baptiste Philibert Vaillant
Marshal of France Bernard Pierre Magnan
Marshal of France Aimable Pélissier
Admiral Ferdinand-Alphonse Hamelin
General Mathieu Brialmont
Engineer general Jacques, comte Mallet
General Émile Herbillon
General Aristide de La Ruë
General Charles Oudinot
General Teodoro Lechi
General François Martineau des Chesnez
General Anne Charles Lebrun
General Émile Mellinet
General Casimir-Louis-Victurnien de Rochechouart de Mortemart
General Albert Joseph Goblet d'Alviella
General Vivant-Jean Brunet-Denon
General Tomasz Łubieński
General Pierre Schaken
General Émile Perrodon
General Pierre Chrétien Korte
General Jean-Ernest Ducos de La Hitte
Vice admiral Odet-Pellion
Rear admiral Louis Tromelin
Colonel Louis Auguste de Bourbel de Montpinçon
Lieutenant colonel Louis-Casimir Teyssier
Commander Joseph Toussaint Bernard
Major Étienne Desjoyeaux
Captain Jean-Joseph Charlier
Captain Amédée de Bast
Captain Claude Noisot
Imperial Guard Officer Martin Marie Benard

Civilian
Doctor François-Joseph Cazin
Pierre François Dumont (1789–1864), French industrialist
Marcellin Jobard
Nicolas Savin

See also

French Imperial Eagle
Grande Armée Slang
List of French general officers (Peninsular War)
Types of military forces in the Napoleonic Wars
Uniforms of La Grande Armée

References

External links
Museum of the Legion of Honour
Napoleon's Great Army

French campaign medals
Awards established in 1857
1857 establishments in France
Awards of British Overseas Territories
Saint Helena, Ascension and Tristan da Cunha culture